The Bond Building is an historic office building located at 1400 New York Avenue, N.W., in downtown Washington, D.C.  It was designed by architect George S. Cooper in 1901.  The building was constructed by Charles Henry Bond, for an estimated $300,000.  A developer bought the building in 1979, and applied for a demolition permit.  D.C. Superior Court Judge William E. Stewart, Jr., blocked demolition in 1980.  It was listed on the National Register of Historic Places in 1983.

References

External links

 1915 photo of the Bond Building

Commercial buildings on the National Register of Historic Places in Washington, D.C.
Office buildings completed in 1901
American Federation of Labor